Mark Whiley (born 1 December 1992) is a former professional Australian rules footballer who played for the Greater Western Sydney Giants and Carlton Football Club in the Australian Football League (AFL).

Originally from Finley in the Riverina region of New South Wales, he played for the Murray Bushrangers in the TAC Cup prior to being recruited prior to the 2010 AFL Draft as one of the new GWS club's NSW zone selections. Whiley made his AFL debut in Round 12 of the 2012 AFL season against , as a late replacement for Nick Haynes.

In October 2014, he was traded to the Carlton Football Club. Whiley made his debut for Carlton against  in Mick Malthouse's record breaking game of most games coached in round 5, 2015. At the conclusion of the 2016 season, he was delisted by Carlton.

Whiley currently plays for Ovens & Murray Football League club Yarrawonga, as of 2017.

Statistics

|- style="background-color: #EAEAEA"
! scope="row" style="text-align:center" | 2012
|
| 42 || 3 || 0 || 0 || 20 || 15 || 35 || 15 || 5 || 0.0 || 0.0 || 6.7 || 5.0 || 11.7 || 5.0 || 1.7
|-
! scope="row" style="text-align:center" | 2013
|
| 42 || 7 || 1 || 0 || 33 || 20 || 53 || 5 || 46 || 0.1 || 0.0 || 4.7 || 2.9 || 7.6 || 0.7 || 6.6
|- style="background:#eaeaea;"
! scope="row" style="text-align:center" | 2014
|
| 42 || 2 || 1 || 0 || 20 || 16 || 36 || 10 || 11 || 0.5 || 0.0 || 10.0 || 8.0 || 18.0 || 5.0 || 5.5
|-
! scope="row" style="text-align:center" | 2015
|
| 24 || 8 || 1 || 2 || 46 || 49 || 95 || 17 || 33 || 0.1 || 0.3 || 5.8 || 6.1 || 11.9 || 2.1 || 4.1
|- style="background:#eaeaea;"
! scope="row" style="text-align:center" | 2016
|
| 24 || 1 || 0 || 0 || 8 || 8 || 16 || 2 || 1 || 0.0 || 0.0 || 8.0 || 8.0 || 16.0 || 2.0 || 1.0
|- class="sortbottom"
! colspan=3| Career
! 21
! 3
! 2
! 127
! 108
! 235
! 49
! 96
! 0.1
! 0.1
! 6.0
! 5.1
! 11.2
! 2.3
! 4.6
|}

References

External links

1992 births
Living people
Greater Western Sydney Giants players
Finley Football Club players
Australian rules footballers from New South Wales
Carlton Football Club players
Preston Football Club (VFA) players
Yarrawonga Football Club players